The Old Calhoun County Courthouse built in 1904 is an historic building located at 314 East Central Avenue in Blountstown, Florida. On October 16, 1980, it was added to the U.S. National Register of Historic Places.

In 1989, the Old Calhoun County Courthouse was listed in A Guide to Florida's Historic Architecture, published by the University of Florida Press. The listing calls it: "one of two  Romanesque Revival courthouses extant in Florida."

References

External links
 Calhoun County listings at National Register of Historic Places
 Florida's Office of Cultural and Historical Programs
 Calhoun County listings
 Calhoun County markers
 Old Calhoun County Courthouse
 Calhoun County Courthouse at Florida's Historic Courthouses
 Florida's Historic Courthouses by Hampton Dunn

Buildings and structures in Calhoun County, Florida
County courthouses in Florida
Courthouses on the National Register of Historic Places in Florida
Blountstown, Florida
National Register of Historic Places in Calhoun County, Florida
1904 establishments in Florida
Government buildings completed in 1904